The 1986 Tolly Cobbold English Professional Championship was a professional non-ranking snooker tournament that took place in February 1986 in Ipswich, England.

Tony Meo won the title by defeating Neal Foulds 9–7 in the final.

Main draw

The Last 32 and 16 were played between 20 and 24 January 1986 at Bristol.

References

English Professional Championship
English Professional Championship
English Professional Championship
English Professional Championship